The Melanosporales are an order of fungi within the class Sordariomycetes.

References 

 
Ascomycota orders

ru:Melanosporales